L'Aurore is a French newspaper published in the period 1897–1916. There are other publications with the same name:

 ⁨⁨L'Aurore⁩⁩ (1909-1941), a French publication published first in Istanbul and then in Cairo 
 L'Aurore (newspaper founded 1944), a French newspaper 
L'Aurore boréale, a Canadian bi-weekly newspaper based in Whitehorse, Yukon

See also
 L'Aurore, an oil painting by William-Adolphe Bouguereau